This is a list of cemeteries in England still in existence. Only cemeteries which are notable and can be visited are included. Churchyards and graveyards that belong to churches and are still in existence are not included. Ancient burial grounds are excluded.

Cemeteries in London and Brighton and Hove have separate lists.

List of existing cemeteries

References

Further reading
Greenwood, Douglas; Who's Buried Where in England (2006); Constable & Robinson; London; 416p; .

External links
National Federation of Cemetery Friends
Preservation of Historic Cemeteries by English Heritage

England